Hans Heinrich Josef Meyer (22 March 1858 – 5 July 1929) was a German geographer from Hildburghausen, who was the son of publisher Herrmann Julius Meyer (1826-1909). Hans Meyer is credited with being the first European to reach the summit of Mount Kilimanjaro 5,895 m (19,341 ft). Kilimanjaro has three peaks: Shira, 3,962 m (12,999 ft); Mawenzi, 5,149 m (16,893 ft); and Kibo, whose summit was reached by Meyer in 1889.

Biography
He studied sciences and history in Leipzig, Berlin and Straßburg, afterward traveling in India, North America and South Africa. Subsequently he visited East Africa and South America. He entered the publishing house of his father, the Bibliographisches Institut at Leipzig, in 1884, and in the following year became one of the directors of the firm; but at intervals he continued his exploring expeditions.

In 1887, during his first attempt to climb Kilimanjaro, Meyer reached the base of Kibo, but was forced to turn back. He did not have the equipment necessary to handle the deep snow and ice on Kibo. In 1888, alongside the Austrian cartographer Oscar Baumann, he explored the Usambara region, with designs of continuing on to Mount Kilimanjaro. However, the two explorers could not proceed on, due to events related with the so-called Abushiri Revolt. Baumann and Meyer, within a matter of days, were captured and held as prisoners. Only after a large ransom was paid to rebel leader Abushiri ibn Salim al-Harthi were the two men released.

In 1889 Meyer returned to Kilimanjaro with the celebrated Austrian mountaineer Ludwig Purtscheller for a third attempt. Their climbing team included two local headmen, nine porters, a cook, and a guide. After Meyer and Purtscheller pushed to near the crater rim on 3 October before retreating to the base of Kibo, they reached the summit on the southern rim of the crater on Purtscheller's 40th birthday, 6 October 1889. Meyer named this summit - now known as Uhuru Point- "Kaiser Wilhelm Spitze". After descending to the saddle between Kibo and Mawenzi, they attempted to climb Mawenzi next, but only reached a subsidiary peak (Klute Peak) before retreating due to illness. In Meyer's honor, the highest summit of Mawenzi nevertheless is known as Hans Meyer Peak. The summit of Kibo would not be climbed again until 20 years later, and the first ascent of Hans Meyer Peak was only in 1912.

In 1899 he became a professor at the University of Leipzig, where in 1915 he was appointed director of the Institute for Colonial Geography. In addition to his African exploits, Meyer did extensive mountain climbing in the Canary Islands (1894) and Ecuador (1904).

Selected publications 
 Eine Weltreise (A Trip around the World), 1885 
 Zum Schneedom des Kilima-Ndscharo, 1888 
 Ostafrikanische Gletscherfahrten, 1890 (later translated into English by E.H.S. Calder as "Across East African Glaciers")
 Die Insel Tenerife (The Island of Tenerife), 1896  
 Der Kilima-Ndscharo (Kilimanjaro), 1900  
 Die Eisenbahnen im tropischen Afrika (Railways in Tropical Africa), 1902 
 In den Hoch-Anden von Ecuador: Chimborazo, Cotopaxi, etc. (In the High Andes of Ecuador; Chimborazo, Cotopaxi, etc.), two volumes 1907 
 Niederländisch-Ostindien. Eine länderkundliche Skizze (The Netherlands Indies; Sketch of the Country), 1922

Notes

References 
 Details on Meyer's Ascent on Kilimanjaro

 Some of this article is based on a translation of the equivalent article from the German Wikipedia.

External links
 

1858 births
1929 deaths
People from Hildburghausen
German mountain climbers
People from Saxe-Meiningen
German publishers (people)
German geographers
German explorers of Africa
Academic staff of Leipzig University